Blair's Harbour is located between Pahang on the east coast of Peninsular Malaysia and the island of Tioman. It never seems to have had any physical presence, but appears (sometimes without the apostrophe or the 's') on many maps of the Malayan Peninsula or surrounding regions during the 19th century, and still appears on Admiralty Charts.

Alexander Dalrymple of the Hydrography Department of the British Admiralty published a plan of this location on 9 February 1793. The surveyor was Lieutenant Archibald Blair of the East India Company's Bombay Marine.

On the plan Blair's Harbour is described as:

A later description of Blair (sic) Harbour is just "The channel between Tanj.Peniabong and Keban I., N.Johore".

References

Ports and harbours of Malaysia
Transport in Pahang